The Fremont Theater is a historic movie theater in San Luis Obispo, California in the United States of America. It is among the last Streamline Moderne theaters built by architect S. Charles Lee. It opened in 1942 on the eve of U.S. entry to World War II. Throughout its early years it served both as a moving pictures theater and a live theater. It hosted war bond shows in early years and later hosted such attractions as Adam Ant and Yes.

In the late 20th century, developers wanted to raze the building to install a new multiplex, but public outcry saved the theater. The company built its multiplex next door, capitalizing off the historic structure while also supporting it financially with the additional screens.

The theater is now one of the main locations for the San Luis Obispo International Film Festival.

See also 
 City of San Luis Obispo Historic Resources

References

External links
Cinema Treasures

Cinemas and movie theaters in California
Buildings and structures in San Luis Obispo, California
Streamline Moderne architecture in California
Theatres completed in 1942
Tourist attractions in San Luis Obispo County, California
1942 establishments in California